"Tha Crossroads" is a song written and performed by hip hop group Bone Thugs-n-Harmony, released as a single in April 1996. The song is dedicated to the group's mentor, the late gangsta rap icon Eazy-E, and other family members. The song was the highest-debuting rap single when it debuted at number two on the US Billboard Hot 100, reaching number one the following week and staying there for eight consecutive weeks. It also reached number one in New Zealand, where it was the most successful single of 1996. In 1997, the song won a Grammy for Best Rap Performance by a Duo or Group.

Background
"Crossroad" originally debuted in 1995 on the E. 1999 Eternal album. It was dedicated to Bone's dead friend Wallace (Wally) Laird III, but after the death of Eazy-E they decided to remake it as "Tha Crossroads". The original song appears on the edited version of the album, though the European release has the original as track number 8 and the remix as track 18. The song is performed by four of the group's members, (Krayzie Bone, Layzie Bone, Bizzy Bone and Wish Bone). After receiving high praise for their song the group decided to make it their third single for their already released album, E. 1999 Eternal.

In 2019, a version including other group member Flesh-n-Bone was released with the Bone Thugs-n-Harmony compilation album Lost Archives Vol 1. (After receiving their publishing rights from Ruthless Records.)

Reception
The song was a hit worldwide and reached the top of the US Billboard Hot 100 and the New Zealand Singles Chart; on the latter chart, it was the most successful song of 1996. It has been certified double platinum in the United States and platinum in New Zealand. In 2008, "Tha Crossroads" was ranked number 33 on VH1's "100 Greatest Songs of Hip Hop".

Music video
The music video was filmed on February 27–28, 1996. It opens with the female vocal group Tre' (Kimberly Cromartie, Rebecca Forsha and Maniko Williams) singing the traditional spiritual "Mary Don't You Weep" in a church funeral setting, followed by the members of Bone Thugs-n-Harmony singing the main song in several settings, such as a church and a mountain top.

The main focus of the video is an imposing man with sunglasses and a trench coat, akin to a Reaper. Bone are among the few who can see the man, and watch him as he gathers souls of various individuals who are marked for death, such as a young man who leaves his distraught mother behind (presumably having died after entering life as a gang member), Bone's friend Wally, Wish Bone's Uncle Charles, Eazy-E, and a newborn baby (possibly to have died from a childbirth complication). The Reaper then leads the souls, with the baby in his arms, up a mountain where he reveals himself to be an angel, then takes the dead to Heaven.

"Tha Crossroads" was nominated for the Best Rap Video at the MTV Video Music Awards in 1996, although it lost to Coolio's "Gangsta's Paradise".

Track listings

US, Canadian, and UK CD single
 "Tha Crossroads" (D.J. U-Neek's Mo Thug remix) – 3:46
 "Tha Crossroads" (D.J. U-Neek's remix instrumental) – 3:46
 "Crossroad" (LP version) – 3:31
 "Crossroad" (LP version instrumental) – 3:23

US 12-inch single
A1. "Tha Crossroads" (D.J. U-Neek's Mo Thug remix) – 3:46
A2. "Tha Crossroads" (D.J. U-Neek's remix instrumental) – 3:46
A3. "Crossroad" (LP version radio edit) – 3:31
B1. "Crossroad" (LP version) – 3:31
B2. "Crossroad" (LP version instrumental) – 3:23
B3. "Budsmokers Only" (LP version) – 3:35

US cassette single and Australian CD1
 "Tha Crossroads" (D.J. U-Neek's Mo Thug remix) – 3:46
 "Crossroad" (LP version) – 3:31

UK cassette single
 "Tha Crossroads" (D.J. U-Neek's Mo Thug remix) – 3:46
 "Budsmokers Only" – 3:35

UK 12-inch single
A1. "Tha Crossroads" (D.J. U-Neek's Mo Thug remix) – 3:46
A2. "Tha Crossroads" (D.J. U-Neek's remix instrumental) – 3:46
B1. "Crossroad" (LP version) – 3:31
B2. "Budsmokers Only" (LP version) – 3:35

European CD single
 "Crossroad" (LP version) – 3:31
 "Tha Crossroads" (D.J. U-Neek's Mo Thug remix) – 3:46

European maxi-CD single
 "Crossroad" (LP version) – 3:31
 "Tha Crossroads" (D.J. U-Neek's Mo Thug remix) – 3:46
 "Tha Crossroads" (D.J. U-Neek's remix instrumental) – 3:46

Australian CD2
 "Tha Crossroads" (D.J. U-Neek's Mo Thug remix)
 "Tha Crossroads" (D.J. U-Neek's remix instrumental)
 "Crossroad" (LP version radio edit)
 "1st of tha Month" (The Kruder and Dorfmeister remix)
 "Thuggish Ruggish Bone"

Charts

Weekly charts

Year-end charts

Decade-charts

Certifications

Release history

Blazin' Squad version

"Crossroads", a retitled and reworked version of "Tha Crossroads", was released by British ten-piece hip-hop group Blazin' Squad as their first single in August 2002. It topped the UK Singles Chart on the week of August 25, 2002.

Background
The group's cover version of "Crossroads" was recorded for inclusion on their first studio album, In the Beginning. The decision to record and release "Crossroads" came about during the final stages of the album production: until June 2002, the song "Standard Flow" was planned for release as the group's first single, with a promotional version of the "Standard Flow" even made available on August 5. Despite being labelled as a cover version, only the chorus from the original version remains, with the verses replaced by new lyrics written by the band. Despite being the only 'cover version' the group ever recorded, it became the band's only number one single, staying at the top of the UK Singles Chart for one week in August 2002. Two versions of the song exist: the main version, which features in the music video and on In the Beginning, and the full version, which contains two extra verses, which appears on the second physical release of the single.

Music video
The music video for "Crossroads" directed by Vaughan Arnell was premiered in July 2002. The video runs for a total length of three minutes and forty-eight seconds and shows the band performing the song on top of an unfinished flyover in the centre of Cape Town. The video also shows scenes of an underpass where a number of homeless people are living, and individual shots of each band member. The video was filmed with the phantom effect, which provides a 'shadow' type movement for each member of the band.

Track listing
 Digital single
 "Crossroads" (radio edit) – 3:10
 "Uproar" – 3:25

 UK CD 1
 "Crossroads" (radio edit) – 3:10
 "Uproar" – 3:25
 "Crossroads" (CD-ROM video) – 3:45

 UK CD 2
 "Crossroads" (full version) – 3:50
 "Offering" – 3:20
 "Crossroads" (T.N.T Remix) – 3:50

 Cassette
 "Crossroads" (radio edit) – 3:10
 "Crossroads" (full version) – 3:50

Charts

Weekly charts

Year-end charts

Certifications

See also
 List of Billboard Hot 100 number-one singles of 1996
 List of number-one R&B singles of 1996 (U.S.)
 List of number-one singles in 1996 (New Zealand)
 List of UK Singles Chart number ones of the 2000s

References

1990s ballads
1995 songs
1996 singles
2002 debut singles
Billboard Hot 100 number-one singles
Blazin' Squad songs
Bone Thugs-n-Harmony songs
Contemporary R&B ballads
Music videos directed by Vaughan Arnell
Number-one singles in New Zealand
Commemoration songs
Songs written by Bizzy Bone
Songs written by Chris Jasper
Songs written by Ernie Isley
Songs written by Krayzie Bone
Songs written by Layzie Bone
Songs written by Marvin Isley
Songs written by O'Kelly Isley Jr.
Songs written by Ronald Isley
Songs written by Rudolph Isley
Songs written by Wish Bone
UK Singles Chart number-one singles